The Bus is a book by Paul Kirchner published in 1987.

Plot summary
The Bus is a book of cartoons by Paul Kirchner. Each strip depicts a man hitching a ride on a bus in increasingly bizarre ways.

Reception
Dave Langford reviewed The Bus for White Dwarf #94, and stated that "these explorations of the Bus in American society are mostly original and weird. They are highly sophisticated humour; consult the book for the page on which this is contrasted with unsophisticated humour."

Reviews
Review by Andy Sawyer (1987) in Paperback Inferno, #68

References

Books about visual art